General Jack may refer to:

Archibald Jack (1874–1939), British Army brigadier general
James Lochhead Jack (1880–1962), British Army brigadier general
Samuel S. Jack (1905–1983), U.S. Marine Corps major general